Sultan Palace Hotel is a hotel in Sana'a, Yemen. Founded in 1987, the hotel is located in one of the oldest buildings in the old part of Sana'a city and is nearly 400 years old.

References
Al-bab.com

Hotels in Yemen
Buildings and structures in Sanaa
Hotels established in 1987